The 1951 La Flèche Wallonne was the 15th edition of La Flèche Wallonne cycle race and was held on 21 April 1951. The race started in Charleroi and finished in Liège. The race was won by Ferdinand Kübler.

General classification

References

1951 in road cycling
1951
1951 in Belgian sport
1951 Challenge Desgrange-Colombo